Kapitan China Yap Kwan Seng (Pha̍k-fa-sṳ: Ya̍p Kôn-sṳ̀n; 1846 – 1902) was the fifth and last Kapitan China of Kuala Lumpur from 1889 to 1902. Kapitans were appointed chiefs or headmen of the various ethnic communities during the period of British colonial rule in what is present-day Malaysia. Kapitans played an important role in the history of the Chinese in Malaysia. They wielded considerable influence, contributing to social, economic and political development in areas under their jurisdiction.

Yap Kwan Seng, of Hakka descent, was born in 1846 in the Chak Kai district of China. He was a Hakka of the Fui Chiu clan. He moved to Malaya at the age of 18 and worked as a tin miner in Seremban.

On his death, The Straits Times carried the following obituary:

Entrepreneurship
In 1870, Yap packed his bags for Selangor, where he began his hard work to help pioneer the tin mining industry. He made his fortune in tin mining.  It is said he had a workforce of 7,000 and soon owned more tin mines than any of his contemporaries.

As a businessman, he foresaw an increased demand for bricks in fast-growing Kuala Lumpur and established a kiln in a district that came to be called Brickfields, a name by which it is still known today.

Yap was elected the fifth Kapitan in 1890 and was also appointed a member of the State Legislative Assembly of Selangor.

He ran his own small police force that helped him manage his many business interests. Yap was also the first Chinese to serve on the Kuala Lumpur Sanitary Board.

During the Pahang War in 1892 and the Boer War, Yap assisted the British by providing transportation, supplies and funds.

Yap also helped introduce the Chinese system of mining in West Africa when he sent thirty of his miners to assist the governor Sir William Maxwell in establishing the mining industry.

Social Contributions

Education
Kapitan Yap was also a firm believer in education and co-founded one of the oldest schools in Kuala Lumpur, Malaysia – Victoria Institution.

Healthcare
Kapitan Yap Kwan Seng’s philanthropic deeds and his many contributions to the birth of Kuala Lumpur are the stuff of history. Among his numerous achievements, perhaps one of the most significant is the founding of Pooi Shin Thong providing free medical services to the poor. The center grew and was later renamed Tung Shin Hospital, located along Jalan Pudu. The expenses were, of course, underwritten by the Kapitan himself.

A compassionate leader, he also co-founded the Tai Wah Ward of the Pauper’s Hospital that became the Kuala Lumpur General Hospital as well as Chak Kai Koong Kon in Jalan Sultan.

Philanthropy
His philanthropic deeds extended beyond Malaya and it is said that a year before he died in 1901, he donated the princely sum of ten thousand dollars towards famine relief in India.

Houses
Yap Kwan Seng owned houses in Kuala Lumpur and Macau.

Kuala Lumpur
The Kapitan’s residence in Kuala Lumpur was located on High Street in Kuala Lumpur’s Chinatown, which is today known as Jalan Tun H.S. Lee.

It was massive, occupying the greater part of the street, with many deep courtyards, and a large garden in front for entertaining guests. Over 50 people, many of whom were servants, lived in the house. The ancestral hall was particularly impressive as it had a grand altar table upon which were placed chunks of crystal, quartz, gold and other precious stones found in the Kapitan’s tin mines.

Macau
The kapitan's mansion in Macau was apparently even bigger than the Kuala Lumpur residence. It was long and deep, with countless rooms, nooks and crannies, and so large that many sections were perpetually dim as they had no access to natural light.

Death and recognition

Yap died in 1902 and was remembered as a highly respected community leader who was greatly concerned with the welfare of the people in the then Malaya through his charity initiatives. After his death in 1902, the position of Kapitan China was abolished. A memorial was erected in his honor in Kuala Lumpur and can be visited today.

A major road in central Kuala Lumpur called Jalan Yap Kwan Seng near the world-famous KLCC is named in his honour. Jalan Sin Chew Kee, which is located off Jalan Hang Tuah, was also named in his honour after his tin mining business.

References

 Last Kapitan's legacy lives on, The Star, 28 April 2007.
 The last Kapitan, The Star, 22 August 2007.
 Photo credit: Joseph Yap 

Kapitan Cina
History of Kuala Lumpur
Malaysian people of Hakka descent
People from Taishan, Guangdong
1846 births
1902 deaths